Tennenbronn is a district of Schramberg in the district of Rottweil, in Baden-Württemberg, Germany.

Towns in Baden-Württemberg
Rottweil (district)